Sharonov is a lunar impact crater that lies on the Moon's far side. It is located to the southeast of the crater Anderson, and to the southwest of the ray-covered Virtanen. To the south-southeast of Sharonov lies Valier.

This crater is roughly circular, with a slight outward bulge along the southern rim. The rim edge is well-defined and has not been significantly degraded as a result of impact erosion. Sharonov partially overlays the smaller crater Sharonov X along the northwestern rim, which in turn connects to the southeastern outer rim of Anderson. The inner walls of Sharonov display some terraces, especially along the northern half. The interior is not marked by any significant impacts, but there are some ridges near the midpoint.

Sharonov is probably part of the Eratosthenian System, but may be part of the Upper Imbrian System.

The crater lies within the Freundlich-Sharonov Basin.

Satellite craters
By convention these features are identified on lunar maps by placing the letter on the side of the crater midpoint that is closest to Sharonov.

References

External links
 Digital Lunar Orbiter Photo Number II-034-H1

Impact craters on the Moon
Imbrian
Eratosthenian